is a very bright micro-asteroid, classified as a near-Earth object of the Apollo group, less than  in diameter. It was first observed by astronomers of the Catalina Sky Survey at Mount Lemmon Observatory, Arizona, on 4 February 2018, during its sub-lunar close encounter with Earth.

2018 flyby
It was observed by the Goldstone Observatory, which constrained its size to no more than 20 meters.

During the flyby its period was changed from 1.48 years to 1.67 years.

Flyby gallery

Other flybys
's orbit is in Earth's neighborhood, so it frequently makes other close approaches to Earth like the 2018 one, although not usually as close.

It also may have passed similarly near Earth in 1914, but the uncertainty in the 1953 approach makes it difficult to determine.

Physical characteristics 

 appears unusually bright for its size, suggesting it is made of brighter materials than the average asteroid.

See also
 List of asteroid close approaches to Earth in 2018

References

External links 

 Minor Planet Circulars of 2018 CB:
 MPEC (C12), 4 February 2018 
 MPEC (C25), 6 February 2018 
 MPEC (C44), 8 February 2018 
 MPEC (C44), 9 February 2018
 
 Watch online as 2 asteroids sweep close this week (2018 CB and 2018 CC), EarthSky, 5 February 2018
 
 

Minor planet object articles (unnumbered)
Discoveries by the Catalina Sky Survey
Near-Earth objects in 2018
20180204